is a railway station in Asahikawa, Hokkaidō, Japan, operated by the Hokkaido Railway Company (JR Hokkaido).

Lines

Adjacent stations

Surrounding area
 National Route 39
 Asahikawa University
 Asahikawa University Junior College
 Asahikawa University High School
 Nagayama Shrine

External links
JR Hokkaido station information 

Railway stations in Hokkaido Prefecture
Railway stations in Japan opened in 1898
Buildings and structures in Asahikawa